Jakobsgatan is a street at Norrmalm in central Stockholm, Sweden. The street stretches from west-east Tegelbacken in the west to Västra Trädgårdsgatan in the east. At Jakobsgatan several entertainment places can be found such as Hamburger Börs and Centralpalatset.

References 

Streets in Stockholm